Quirino's at-large congressional district is the sole congressional district of the Philippines in the province of Quirino. It has been represented in the House of Representatives since 1987 and earlier in the Batasang Pambansa from 1984 to 1986.

Quirino first elected a single representative provincewide at-large for the Regular Batasang Pambansa of the Fourth Philippine Republic in 1984 or more than 12 years since its creation as a regular province separate from Nueva Vizcaya on September 10, 1971. Due to the 1972 imposition of martial law and subsequent dissolution of both houses of Congress, the then newly-created province has not had a representative elected as provided for in its provincial charter until the restoration of a national legislature in 1978 following a shift to a parliamentary form of government. However, in the national parliament known as the Interim Batasang Pambansa, provincial district representation was replaced by regional representation, with Quirino having been included in the eight-seat Region II's at-large assembly district. The province only elected its first representative following the 1984 Philippine constitutional plebiscite which restored the province, city or district representation in parliament. The district was re-created on February 2, 1987 following the ratification of the 1987 constitution that restored the House of Representatives.

The district is currently represented in the 19th Congress by Midy Cua, who ran as a member of Pederalismo ng Dugong Dakilang Samahan in the 2022 general elections but took her oath as member of Lakas–CMD before the opening of the said legislative period.

Representation history

Election results

2022

2019

2016

2013

2010

See also
Legislative districts of Quirino

References

Congressional districts of the Philippines
Politics of Quirino
1984 establishments in the Philippines
At-large congressional districts of the Philippines
Congressional districts of Cagayan Valley
Constituencies established in 1984